Baron Cadman, of Silverdale in the County of Stafford, is a title in the Peerage of the United Kingdom. It was created in 1937 for John Cadman, a mining engineer, petroleum technologist and public servant.  the title is held by his grandson, the third Baron, who succeeded his father in 1966.

Barons Cadman (1937)
John Cadman, 1st Baron Cadman (1877–1941)
John Basil Cope Cadman, 2nd Baron Cadman (1909–1966)
John Anthony Cadman, 3rd Baron Cadman (b. 1938)

The heir apparent is the present holder's son the Hon. Nicholas Anthony James Cadman (b. 1977)

Arms

References

Kidd, Charles, Williamson, David (editors). Debrett's Peerage and Baronetage (1990 edition). New York: St Martin's Press, 1990.

Baronies in the Peerage of the United Kingdom
Noble titles created in 1937